Anti-Nasty League is the seventh studio album by English industrial rock band Pop Will Eat Itself, released on 25 April 2015 by Rumjoint Records.

Promotion
In June 2014 Pop Will Eat Itself released "Reclaim the Game (Funk FIFA)" and "Watch the Bitch Blow" in August, with the latter appearing on Anti-Nasty League. In preparation for the album's release the single "Digital Meltdown" was featured on Soccer AM on 28 March 2015. Following the album's pre-order and digital release on 25 April 2015 the band embarked on a 9-date tour of England starting with a sold-out gig in Leicester on 22 May 2015 and concluding at Leamington Spa on 30 May 2015. A video for 21st Century English Civil War was released on 1 May 2015

Reception
Writing for Louder Than War, David J Harris noted "It’s an album that’s brimming with vitality. Many of the verses are rapped over thick driving bass riffs that rip into stimulating metal guitar licks fused with instantaneous catchy choruses" and awarded the album 9/10. Rockregeneration.co.uk noted the album's "political/social commentary" and highlighted the album's punk rock attitude stating "Throughout this album is the underlying message to [...] rise up against what is happening around you". In writing for Record Collector, Tim Peacock awarded the album 4/5, praising the tracks Watch The Bitch Blow and Digital Meltdown, while also stating that two songs on the album "credibly hark back to the Poppies at their hard-hitting, Dos Dedos-era best"

Track listing

Personnel
Adapted from the album's liner notes.

Pop Will Eat Itself
 Graham Crabb - Vocals, Keyboards, Programming
 Mary Byker - Vocals, Keyboards, Programming
 Tim Muddiman - Guitar, Bass, Keyboards, Programming
 Davey Bennett - Bass
 Jason Bowld - Drums

Additional Personnel
 Dave Ogilvie - Guitar (1)
 Kurt Maas - Guitar (1)
 Noko 440 - Keyboards (3, 8, 12), Programming (3), Add. Bass (3, 12), Add. Guitar (8)
 Kerry "The Buzzard" Hammond - Guitar (4, 11, 12)

References

Pop Will Eat Itself albums
2015 albums